Noemi Cantele (born 17 July 1981) is a professional road bicycle racer. In 2012, she rides for the Be Pink team in women's elite professional events on the National Racing Calendar and UCI Women's World Cup. She competed at the 2012 Summer Olympics in the Women's road race and the Women's time trial.

Palmarès 

2006
 1st stage 2a, 4a and 6 Giro della Toscana Int. Femminile – Memorial Michela Fanini
2009
 2nd UCI Road World Championship Women's Time Trial
 3rd UCI Road Race World Championships
 1st Emakumeen Saria
 1st GP Brissago
 1st Stage 5, Giro d'Italia Femminile
 1st Italian National Championships ITT
2010  – Team HTC-Columbia 2010 season
3rd overall, Giro della Toscana Int. Femminile – Memorial Michela Fanini
1st Stage 3
3rd overall, Thüringen Rundfahrt der Frauen
2011
1st Italian National Championships road race
1st Italian National Championships ITT
2012
1st GP El Salvador
1st Stage 1, Vuelta El Salvador
2nd 2012 Le Samyn des Dames
1st GP Liberazione
1st Stage 1, Giro del Trentino Alto Adige - Südtirol

External links 
 Profile on procm.ch
 

1981 births
Living people
Italian female cyclists
Cyclists from Varese
Cyclists at the 2004 Summer Olympics
Cyclists at the 2008 Summer Olympics
Cyclists at the 2012 Summer Olympics
Olympic cyclists of Italy